Abraham "Avi" Loeb (born February 26, 1962) is an Israeli-American theoretical physicist who works on astrophysics and cosmology. Loeb is the Frank B. Baird Jr. Professor of Science at Harvard University. He had been the longest serving chair of Harvard's Department of Astronomy (2011–2020), founding director of Harvard's Black Hole Initiative (since 2016) and director of the Institute for Theory and Computation (since 2007) within the Harvard-Smithsonian Center for Astrophysics.

Loeb is a fellow of the American Academy of Arts and Sciences, the American Physical Society, and the International Academy of Astronautics. In July 2018, he was appointed as chair of the Board on Physics and Astronomy (BPA) of the National Academies, which is the Academies' forum for issues connected with the fields of physics and astronomy, including oversight of their decadal surveys.

In June 2020, Loeb was sworn in as a member of the President's Council of Advisors on Science and Technology (PCAST) at the White House. In December 2012, Time magazine selected Loeb as one of the 25 most influential people in space. In 2015, Loeb was appointed as the science theory director for the Breakthrough Initiatives of the Breakthrough Prize Foundation. In 2018, he attracted media attention for suggesting that alien space craft may be in the Solar System, using the anomalous behavior of ʻOumuamua as an example. In 2019, and together with his Harvard undergraduate student, Amir Siraj, Loeb reported discovering a meteor that potentially originated outside the Solar System.

Career
Loeb was born in Beit Hanan, Israel in 1962. He took part in the national Talpiot program before receiving a PhD in plasma physics, at age 24, from the Hebrew University in Jerusalem, in 1986. From 1983 to 1988, he led the first international project supported by the U.S. Strategic Defense Initiative. Between 1988 and 1993, Loeb was a long-term member at the Institute for Advanced Study at Princeton, where he started to work in theoretical astrophysics. In 1993, he moved to Harvard University as an assistant professor in the department of astronomy, where he was tenured three years later.

Loeb has written eight books and authored or co-authored about 800 papers on a broad range of research areas in astrophysics and cosmology, including the first stars, the epoch of reionization, the formation and evolution of massive black holes, the search for extraterrestrial life, gravitational lensing by planets, gamma-ray bursts at high redshifts, 21-cm cosmology, the use of the Lyman-alpha forest to measure the acceleration/deceleration of the universe in real time (the so-called "Sandage–Loeb test"), the future collision between the Milky Way and Andromeda galaxies, the future state of extragalactic astronomy, astrophysical implications of black hole recoil in galaxy mergers, tidal disruption of stars, and imaging black hole silhouettes. In 2010, he wrote a textbook entitled How Did the First Stars and Galaxies Form?

In 1992, Loeb suggested, with Andy Gould, that exoplanets could be detected through gravitational microlensing. In 1993, he proposed the use of the C+ fine-structure line to discover galaxies at high redshifts. In 2005, he predicted, in a series of papers with his postdoc at the time, Avery Broderick, how a hot spot in orbit around a black hole would appear; their predictions were confirmed in 2018 by the GRAVITY instrument on the Very Large Telescope which observed a circular motion of the centroid of light of the black hole at the center of the Milky Way, Sagittarius A*. In 2009, Broderick and Loeb predicted the shadow of the black hole in the giant elliptical galaxy Messier 87, which was imaged in 2019 by the Event Horizon Telescope. 

In 2013, a report was published on the discovery of the "Einstein Planet" Kepler-76b, the first Jupiter size exoplanet identified through the detection of relativistic beaming of its parent star, based on a technique proposed by Loeb and Gaudi in 2003. In addition, a pulsar was discovered around the supermassive black hole, Sagittarius A*, following a prediction by Pfahl and Loeb in 2004. Also, a hypervelocity star candidate from the Andromeda galaxy was discovered, as predicted by Sherwin, Loeb, and O'Leary in 2008. Together with his postdoc, James Guillochon, Loeb predicted the existence of a new population of stars moving near the speed of light throughout the universe. Together with his postdoc John Forbes and Howard Chen of Northwestern University, Loeb made another prediction that sub-Neptune sized exoplanets have been transformed into rocky super-Earths by the activity of Milky Way's central supermassive black hole Sagittarius A*.

Together with Paolo Pani, Loeb showed in 2013 that primordial black holes in the range between the masses of the Moon and the Sun cannot make up the dark matter. Loeb led a team that reported tentative evidence for the birth of a black hole in the young nearby supernova SN 1979C. In collaboration with Dan Maoz, Loeb demonstrated in 2013 that biomarkers, such as molecular oxygen, can be detected by the James Webb Space Telescope (JWST) in the atmosphere of Earth-mass planets in the habitable zone of white dwarfs.

Early universe 

In a series of papers with his students and postdocs, Loeb addressed how and when the first stars and black holes formed and what effects they had on the young universe. Together with his former student Steve Furlanetto, Loeb published a textbook, The First Galaxies in the Universe. In 2013, Loeb introduced the new concept of "The Habitable Epoch of the Early Universe", and mentored Harvard undergraduate, Henry Lin, in the study of industrial pollution on exoplanets as a new method to search for extraterrestrial civilizations. In April 2021, Loeb presented an updated summary of his ideas of life in the early universe.

Panspermia 
In 2020, Loeb published a research paper about the possibility that life can propagate from one planet to another, followed by the opinion piece "Noah’s Spaceship" about directed panspermia.

ʻOumuamua 

In December 2017, Loeb cited ʻOumuamua's unusually elongated shape as one of the reasons why the Green Bank Telescope in West Virginia should listen for radio emissions from it to see if there were any unexpected signs that it might be of artificial origin, although earlier limited observations by other radio telescopes such as the SETI Institute's Allen Telescope Array had produced no such results. On December 13, 2017, the Green Bank Telescope observed the asteroid for six hours. No radio signals from ʻOumuamua have been detected.

On October 26, 2018, Loeb and his postdoctoral student Shmuel Bialy submitted a paper exploring the possibility of the interstellar object ʻOumuamua being an artificial thin solar sail accelerated by solar radiation pressure in an effort to help explain the object's non-gravitational acceleration. Other scientists have stated that the available evidence is insufficient to consider such a premise, and that a tumbling solar sail would not be able to accelerate. In response, Loeb wrote an article detailing six anomalous properties of ʻOumuamua that make it unusual, unlike any comets or asteroids seen before.

On November 27, 2018, Loeb and Amir Siraj, an undergraduate student at Harvard College, proposed a search for ʻOumuamua-like objects which might be trapped in the Solar System as a result of losing orbital energy through a close encounter with Jupiter. They identified four candidates (2011 SP25, 2017 RR2, 2017 SV13, and 2018 TL6) for trapped interstellar objects which could be visited by dedicated missions. The authors pointed out that future sky surveys, such as with Large Synoptic Survey Telescope, could find many more.

In public interviews and private communications with reporters and academic colleagues, Loeb has become more vocal regarding the prospects of proving the existence of alien life. On April 16, 2019, Loeb and Siraj reported the discovery of the first meteor of interstellar origin. Extraterrestrial: The First Sign of Intelligent Life Beyond Earth, a popular science account concerning ʻOumuamua, written by Loeb, was published in 2021.

The Galileo Project 

In July 2021, Loeb founded The Galileo Project for the Systematic Scientific Search for Evidence of Extraterrestrial Technological Artifacts. The project was inspired by the detection of ʻOumuamua and by release of the Office of the Director of National Intelligence report on Unidentified Aerial Phenomena (UAP). As stated on the project's web-site, the aim is:

The three main avenues of research are:
 Obtaining high-resolution images of UAPs and discovering their nature
 
 Search for and research of ʻOumuamua-like interstellar objects
 Search for potential ETC satellites

Unlike other similar projects, the goal of the Galileo Project is to search for physical objects, and not electromagnetic signals, associated with extraterrestrial technological equipment.The project was covered by many independent publishers, among them Nature, Science, New York Post, Scientific American, The Guardian, etc. To the allegations that studies of UFOs is pseudo-science, Loeb answers that the aim of the project is not to study UFOs based on previous data, but to study Unidentified Aerial Phenomena "using the standard scientific method based on a transparent analysis of open scientific data to be collected using optimized instruments."

Media appearances 

In 2006, Loeb was featured in a Time magazine cover story on the first stars, and in a Scientific American article on the Dark Ages of the universe. In 2008, he was featured in a Smithsonian magazine cover story on black holes, and in two Astronomy magazine cover stories, one on the collision between the Milky Way and the Andromeda Galaxy and the second on the future state of our universe. In 2009, Loeb reviewed in a Scientific American article a new technique for imaging black hole silhouettes. Loeb received considerable media attention after proposing in 2011 (with E.L. Turner) a new technique for detecting artificially-illuminated objects in the Solar System and beyond, and showing in 2012 (with I. Ginsburg) that planets may transit hypervelocity stars or get kicked to a fraction of the speed of light near the black hole at the center of the Milky Way.

Science magazine published an article about Loeb's career in April 2013, and Discover reviewed his research on the first stars in April 2014. The New York Times published a science profile of Loeb in December 2014. In May 2015, Astronomy posted a podcast of an hour-long interview with Loeb in its series entitled "Superstars of Astronomy". In April 2016, Stephen Hawking visited Loeb's home and attended the inaugurations of the Starshot and Black Hole Initiatives that Loeb leads.

Loeb's eBook on Kindle details his career path from childhood on a farm with interests in philosophy to chairing the Harvard astronomy department and directing the ITC, and includes opinion essays on the importance of taking risks in research and promoting diversity. Loeb writes opinion essays on science and policy. On January 14, 2021, Loeb appeared on the Lex Fridman Podcast (#154), on January 16, 2021, on the Joe Rogan Experience podcast (#1596), on August 11, 2021, on the  Mick West TFTRH (#55), on November 4, 2022, on the H3 Podcast (#257).

Honors and awards 

Loeb has received many honors, including:
 2015 – Elected Fellow of the International Academy of Astronautics (IAA) SETI Permanent Committee
 2015 – Elected Member of the American Physical Society (APS)
 2014 – Member of the Board on Physics & Astronomy (BPA) of the National Academies 
 2013 – Chambliss Astronomical Writing Award from the American Astronomical Society, for the book “How Did the First Stars and Galaxies Form?” (2010)
 2013 – Miegunyah Distinguished Visiting Fellowship, University of Melbourne, Australia
 2012 – Elected member of the American Academy of Arts & Sciences
 2012 – Galileo Galilei Chair (Cattedra Galileiana) Award, Scuola Normale Superiore, Pisa, Italy
 2011 – Sackler Lecturer in Astronomy, Leiden Observatory, Netherlands
 2011 – Las Cumbres Observatory Prize Lecturer in Astrophysics, UC Santa Barbara
 2009 – Distinguished Visiting Scientist at the Carnegie Observatories, Pasadena
 2007 – Inaugural Australian Institute of Physics (AIP) End of Year Lecturer
 2007 – Merle Kingsley Distinguished Visitor at the California Institute of Technology (Caltech)
 2006/7 – John Bahcall Lecturer at Tel Aviv University University
 2006 – Salpeter Lectureship at Cornell University
 2004 – Distinguished Visiting Professorship at the Faculty of Physics and the Einstein Center for Theoretical Physics, Weizmann Institute of Science
 2002 – Guggenheim Fellowship
 1987 – The Kennedy Prize, Hebrew University of Jerusalem

See also
CNEOS 2014-01-08

References

External links
 Avi Loeb's home page
 Loeb's recent preprints
 Loeb's published papers
 An introductory movie to Loeb's book
 Search for Interstellar Monuments (Avi Loeb; Scientific American; September 2021).

1962 births
Living people
Israeli physicists
Harvard University faculty
20th-century American astronomers
21st-century American astronomers
American cosmologists
Fellows of the American Academy of Arts and Sciences
Jewish physicists
Harvard–Smithsonian Center for Astrophysics people